Demarest House may refer to:

in the United States (by state then city)
Demarest-Atwood House, Cresskill, New Jersey, listed on the National Register of Historic Places (NRHP) in Bergen County
John R. Demarest House, Demarest, New Jersey, listed on the NRHP in Bergen County
Samuel R. Demarest House, Demarest, New Jersey, listed on the NRHP in Bergen County
Daniel Demarest House, Dumont, New Jersey, listed on the NRHP in Bergen County
Thomas Demarest House, Englewood, New Jersey, listed on the NRHP in Bergen County
Ackerman-Demarest House, Ho-Ho-Kus, New Jersey, listed on the NRHP in Bergen County
Blauvelt-Demarest House, Hillsdale, New Jersey, listed on the NRHP in Bergen County
Davenport–Demarest House, Montville, New Jersey, listed on the NRHP in Morris County
Demarest House (New Brunswick, New Jersey), listed on the NRHP in Middlesex County
Demarest House (Oakland, New Jersey), listed on the NRHP in Bergen County
Jacobus Demarest House, Oakland, New Jersey, listed on the NRHP in Bergen County
Demarest-Bloomer House, New Milford, New Jersey, listed on the NRHP in Bergen County
Demarest-Hopper House, Oakland, New Jersey, listed on the NRHP in Bergen County
Demarest House (Oradell, New Jersey), listed on the NRHP in Bergen County
Debaun-Demarest House, River Edge, New Jersey, listed on the NRHP in Bergen County
Demarest House (River Edge, New Jersey), listed on the NRHP in Bergen County
Haring-Blauvelt-Demarest House, River Vale, New Jersey, listed on the NRHP in Bergen County
Cornelius Demarest House, Rochelle Park, New Jersey, listed on the NRHP in Bergen County
Brinkerhoff-Demarest House, Teaneck, New Jersey, listed on the NRHP in Bergen County
Demarest-Lyle House, Tenafly, New Jersey, listed on the NRHP in Bergen County